Amacher is a surname of German origin. Notable people with the surname include:

Maryanne Amacher (1938–2009), American composer and installation artist
Ryan C. Amacher (1945–2016), American economics professor, dean, and university president
Rhein D. Amacher (1990-), German-American former collegiate NCAA Division I athlete for the Oregon Ducks from 2008 to 2010.

References

Surnames of German origin